Hanafi Moustafa was an Egyptian weightlifter. He competed in the men's heavyweight event at the 1948 Summer Olympics.

References

Year of birth missing
Year of death missing
Egyptian male weightlifters
Olympic weightlifters of Egypt
Weightlifters at the 1948 Summer Olympics
Place of birth missing